The ACC–Big Ten Challenge (or Big Ten–ACC Challenge as it was called in alternating years) was an in-season NCAA Division I men's college basketball series that matched up teams from the Atlantic Coast Conference (ACC) and the Big Ten Conference (B1G). ESPN was a key part of the creation of the challenge and held the broadcast rights to all the games. The ACC–Big Ten Challenge occurred early in the non-conference season, typically around late November/early December. Each game was hosted by one of the participating schools, with teams typically alternating home and away status in each successive year.

Played yearly from 1999 to 2022, the Challenge is the longest-running interconference men's basketball challenge series. Across more than two decades of the Challenge, the ACC led 13–8–3 in the series and 152–127 in games. The ACC won the first 10 consecutive challenges, but only two of the next 13 challenges. In the 24 years of the event, 17 of the Challenges were decided by a single game or ended in a tie. Six of the other 7 Challenges were won by the ACC by larger margins.

The popularity of the Challenge led other conferences to form similar partnerships in which their members go head-to-head against each other. Examples include the Big 12/Pac-10 Hardwood Series (2007–2010), SEC–Big East Challenge (2007–2012), Mountain West–Missouri Valley Challenge (2009–2018), Big 12/SEC Challenge (2013–present), Big East–Big 12 Battle (2019–present) and the Gavitt Tipoff Games between the Big East and Big Ten (2015-2022). A sister series to the Challenge featuring women's basketball called the ACC–Big Ten Women's Challenge (2007–present) has been held for all but the first eight years.

The ACC initially played a short-lived interconference basketball series called the ACC–Big East Challenge (1989–1991), Big East coaches such as the late Georgetown coach John Thompson voted to end the ACC–Big East Challenge in 1991, which led to the ACC immediately looking to schedule a new series with the Big Ten as its preferred partner.

On November 28, 2022, amid ESPN losing its media rights to the Big Ten, it was announced that the series would be discontinued after the 2022–23 season. ESPN will arrange an ACC—SEC series as a replacement beginning in the 2023–24 season.

Format
Typically, match-ups are selected for their expected interest in the game.  Higher profile teams are chosen to play each other to enhance television ratings for ESPN.  Minnesota and Florida State have had the most matches together, with six games.  Seven other pairs of teams have faced each other five times in the Challenge. 

With the exception of two years (2011–12), the imbalance of the number of teams in each conference result in up to three teams not playing.  Nine games were scheduled for each of the first six challenges, leaving two teams from the 11-team Big Ten without an opponent. With the expansion of the ACC to 12 teams with the addition of Boston College, Miami, and Virginia Tech, the field was expanded to 11 games in 2006, meaning that one ACC team would not play. With Nebraska joining the Big Ten in 2011, the challenge expanded to 12 games and every member from both conferences participated. In 2013, Syracuse, Pittsburgh, and Notre Dame joined the ACC, leaving three ACC teams excluded from the competition. In 2014, Maryland withdrew from the ACC and joined the Big Ten along with Rutgers, giving that conference 14 teams, and Louisville joined the ACC replacing Maryland and maintaining the conference's 15-team membership. The conference realignments have thus led to the challenge being expanded to 14 games. When the challenge was expanded to 12 games, and later 14 games, the changes resulted in the possibility that the challenge could end in a tie. In the event of a tie, the previous year's winner retains the Commissioner's Cup. This scenario occurred most recently when the ACC retained the Cup in 2018 based on its 11–3 win in 2017, while the Big Ten retained the Cup in 2012 and 2013 based on its 8–4 win in 2011.

Yearly results

Team records
The University of Maryland, College Park has a unique record in the Challenge, having competed for both sides after switching conferences in 2014. The Terrapins established a 10–5 record representing the ACC against Big Ten teams, but have since had a 2–7 record representing the Big Ten against ACC teams. Maryland's overall record is 12–12 but is listed below according to its relevant conference affiliations.

Atlantic Coast Conference (13–8–3) 
Duke was the most successful team in either conference in Challenge competition by a large margin, holding a 20–4 record. Two other ACC schools (Virginia and Wake Forest) won more games in the Challenge than any Big Ten school. Seven ACC schools overall had winning records while two others have a .500 record.

The column "Out" indicates the number of Challenges from which the team was excluded. This does not include cancellations.
†North Carolina State has also had one game cancelled, in 2020.
‡Virginia has also had two games cancelled, in 2001 due to court conditions and in 2020.

Big Ten Conference (8–13–3) 
Purdue (13–9) was the Big Ten team with the best record in the Challenge and the only Big Ten team with an overall winning record. Four schools had a .500 record.

The column "Out" indicates the number of Challenges from which the team was excluded. This does not include cancellations.
†Michigan has also had one game cancelled, in 2020.
‡Michigan State has also had two games cancelled, in 2001 due to court conditions and in 2020.

Results

2022 ACC 8–6

Source:

2021 Big Ten 8–6

Source:

2020 Big Ten 7–5 

Source:

2019 Big Ten 8–6

2018 Tied 7–7

2017 ACC 11–3

Source

2016 ACC 9–5

Source

2015 Big Ten 8–6

2014 Big Ten 8–6

Source

2013 Tied 6–6

2012 Tied 6–6

2011 Big Ten 8–4

2010 Big Ten 6–5

2009 Big Ten 6–5

2008 ACC 6–5

2007 ACC 8–3

2006 ACC 8–3

2005 ACC 6–5

2004 ACC 7–2

2003 ACC 7–2

2002 ACC 5–4

2001 ACC 5–3

2000 ACC 5–4

1999 ACC 5–4

References

Atlantic Coast Conference men's basketball
Big Ten Conference men's basketball
College men's basketball competitions in the United States
College basketball competitions
Recurring sporting events established in 1999
Recurring sporting events disestablished in 2022